Lutheran Mass or Lutheran mass may refer to:

Liturgy
Eucharist in Lutheranism
Divine Service (Lutheran)

Music
Missa brevis, a mass composition only consisting of Kyrie and Gloria
Clavier-Übung III, parts of which are sometimes referred to as Bach's Lutheran mass